Rush is the soundtrack album for the 1991 film of the same name.  Written and performed by Eric Clapton, the soundtrack album includes the song "Tears in Heaven," which won three Grammy awards in 1993.

In a review of the album, AllMusic Guide wrote: "This album has far more impact than you might expect from the score to a movie — there's a sense of the music here working something out in Clapton's heart, a sense given a lot of power thanks to the intense, heart-rending passion invoked by some of the turns taken here. At its best, Clapton's music can speak of the pain he feels — and Clapton has rarely been better than he is here."

Track listing
All songs written by Eric Clapton, except where noted:
 "New Recruit" – 1:30
 "Tracks and Lines" – 3:00
 "Realization" – 2:41
 "Kristen and Jim" – 3:38
 "Preludin Fugue" – 3:19
 "Cold Turkey" – 2:21
 "Will Gaines" – 3:46
 "Help Me Up" (Clapton, Will Jennings) – 5:50
 "Don't Know Which Way to Go" (Willie Dixon, Al Perkins) – 10:46
 "Tears in Heaven" (Clapton, Jennings) – 4:30

Personnel

Musicians – Score
 Eric Clapton – guitar
 Randy Kerber – keyboards
 Greg Phillinganes – keyboards
 Chuck Leavell – piano and organ
 Robbie Kondor – synthesizer
 Nathan East – bass
 Tim Drummond – bass
 Steve Ferrone – drums
 Lenny Castro – percussion
 Bruce Dukov – concertmaster

Musicians – Songs
"Help Me Up"
 Eric Clapton – vocals, guitar
 Randy Kerber – organ
 Greg Phillinganes – piano
 Nathan East – bass
 Steve Ferrone – drums
 Lenny Castro – percussion
 Bill Champlin, Vaneese Thomas, Jenni Muldaur, Lani Groves – background vocals
 Synth horns arranged and performed by David Frank

"Don't Know Which Way to Go"
 Buddy Guy – vocals, guitar
 Eric Clapton – guitar
 Chuck Leavell – piano
 Greg Phillinganes – organ
 Nathan East – bass
 Steve Ferrone – drums

"Tears in Heaven"
 Eric Clapton – vocals, guitar, dobro
 Randy Kerber – synthesizer
 JayDee Maness – pedal steel
 Nathan East – bass
 Gayle Levant – Celtic harp
 Lenny Castro – percussion
 Jimmy Bralower – drum machine

Chart performance

Weekly charts

References

Albums produced by Russ Titelman
Eric Clapton soundtracks
Crime film soundtracks
1992 soundtrack albums
Warner Records soundtracks